STS-3  was NASA's third Space Shuttle mission, and was the third mission for the Space Shuttle Columbia. It launched on March 22, 1982, and landed eight days later on March 30, 1982. The mission, crewed by Jack R. Lousma and C. Gordon Fullerton, involved extensive orbital endurance testing of the Columbia itself, as well as numerous scientific experiments. STS-3 was the first shuttle launch with an unpainted external tank, and the only mission to land at the White Sands Space Harbor near Alamogordo, New Mexico. The orbiter was forced to land at White Sands due to flooding at its originally planned landing site, Edwards Air Force Base.

Crew 

Commander Jack R. Lousma previously flew as pilot of the second Skylab crew (Skylab 3), staying aboard the space station for 59 days from July to September 1973. Lousma had previously been selected in 1978 as Pilot for STS-2, which was then scheduled as a Skylab reboost mission. When delays in the Shuttle's development prevented Columbia from being launched in time to rendezvous with Skylab in 1979, STS-2 Commander Fred W. Haise Jr. retired from NASA and Lousma was then moved up as Commander of STS-3. Lousma also served on the support crews for Apollo 9, 10 and 13; he was the CAPCOM during the time of the latter mission's near-disastrous accident. He was also selected as backup Docking Module Pilot for the Apollo-Soyuz Test Project (ASTP) in 1975.

Fullerton was a rookie who transferred to NASA in 1969 after the cancelation of the U.S. Air Force's Manned Orbiting Laboratory (MOL) program. Fullerton had previous experience with the Shuttle as he had flown the shuttle Enterprise as Pilot alongside Haise during the Approach and Landing Tests (ALT) program in 1977. He also served as part of the support crew for Apollo 14, 15, 16 and 17.

Backup crew

Support crew 
 Terry J. Hart (ascent CAPCOM) 
 Steven R. Nagel (entry CAPCOM)
 George D. Nelson
 Sally K. Ride
 Brewster H. Shaw
 David M. Walker

Mission summary 
Columbia was launched from Kennedy Space Center at 16:04UTC, on March 22, 1982, the planned launch date. This was the first launch with an unpainted external tank (ET). The launch was delayed by one hour due to the failure of a heater on a nitrogen-gas ground support line. Prior to the launch, Columbia had spent only 70 days in the Orbiter Processing Facility – a record checkout time.

The primary objectives of the flight were to continue testing the Remote Manipulator System (Canadarm), and to carry out extensive thermal testing of Columbia by exposing its tail, nose and top to the Sun for varying periods of time. The crew found that prolonged exposure to the Sun caused the cargo bay doors to warp slightly, preventing them from closing fully. Rolling the orbiter to balance temperatures around the orbiter resolved the issue.

In addition, in its payload bay, Columbia again carried the Development Flight Instrumentation (DFI) package, and OSS-l (named for the NASA Office of Space Science and Applications) which consisted of a number of instruments mounted on a Spacelab pallet, intended to obtain data on the near-Earth environment and the extent of contamination caused by the orbiter itself. Among other experiments, the OSS pallet contained a X-ray detector for measuring the polarization of X-rays emitted by solar flares. A test canister for the Small Self-Contained Payload program – also known as the Getaway Special (GAS) – was mounted on one side of the payload bay.

For the first time, a number of experiments were carried in the shuttle's mid-deck lockers. These included an Electrophoresis Equipment Verification Test experiment to study the separation of biological components, and a Mono-disperse Latex Reactor experiment, to produce uniform micrometer-sized latex particles. The first Shuttle Student Involvement Project (SSIP) – a study of insect motion – also was carried in a mid-deck locker.

A variety of minor problems were experienced during the flight. The orbiter's toilet malfunctioned on first use resulting in, according to Lousma, "eight days of colorful flushing"; one Auxiliary Power Unit (APU) overheated (but worked properly during descent); both crew members experienced some space sickness; and on March 26, 1982, three communications links were lost.

STS-3 was planned as a 7-day flight. The landing was moved to Northrop Strip (later renamed White Sands Space Harbor) at White Sands Missile Range, New Mexico since the planned landing site at Edwards Air Force Base had flooded. Lousma and Fullerton chose to land at White Sands instead of the new Shuttle Landing Facility (SLF) at Kennedy Space Center (KSC) because they had trained there. A large-scale equipment movement (reportedly "40 train carloads") from Edwards Air Force Basa to White Sands was undertaken before and during the mission, to ensure that a landing could be fully supported. Although time-sensitive equipment movements of this nature were originally to be handled by Air Force cargo planes, NASA altered those plans and moved the equipment in two dedicated trains over the  - distance via the Santa Fe Railroad and the Southern Pacific Railroad. The choice to move the support equipment by rail saved NASA approximately US$2 million in transportation costs. High winds at White Sands reduced visibility and delayed the landing by a day. As all mission objectives had been accomplished, the crew enjoyed what Lousma described as "an extra day in our world's favorite vacation spot ... We finally had a chance to look out the window and enjoy being there".

As on the previous day's wave off, strong westerly high level winds were in excess of system verification values. As a result, Columbia had to fly a less desirable high "right base" turn onto final approach instead of the more usual and forgiving overhead pattern. At this stage in the test program the Orbiter had significantly less electronic energy management information available to the crew than on later missions. With the runway visible only on his side Fullerton called the turn in for his commander. Their escorting T-38s were led by astronaut Dick Covey and NASA photographer Pete Stanley. The final approach was in part flown by the shuttle's autopilot, but the autoland software was not complete so it could not include an automatic landing. Rolling out on final approach, the autopilot was reengaged, and responded by closing the speedbrakes (despite the orbiter being on profile), resulting in increased speed. The autopilot then commanded full speedbrakes, and kept oscillating like this for some time. Lousma left the autopilot activated in order to gather data on its behavior, but disconnected it again at a very late stage to touch down manually. Early automatic speed brake closure had resulted in high speed on the inner glideslope and Lousma opted to touchdown fast rather than excessively long. The nose then began to lower at greater than planned airspeed and raised again right before nose-gear touchdown. Touchdown occurred at 16:04:46UTC on March 30, 1982, on runway 17 at Northrop Strip.

Former Administrator of NASA Charles F. Bolden Jr. stated that Lousma was trained to disengage autoland by moving the control stick. He rolled the stick, but did not pitch it sufficiently, so autoland was still partially engaged until Fullerton warned him, causing Lousma to pitch up; Bolden, who had worked on the autoland system early in his astronaut career prior to his first space flight, stated in 2004 that the crew "saved the vehicle" by doing so.

STS-3 was the only shuttle mission to land at White Sands Missile Range. The unexpectedly difficult landing and post flight conditions damaged the shuttle, requiring extensive repair at KSC. So much gypsum dust covered Columbia that Bolden recalled, "I flew it several flights later on my first flight, STS-61-C, and when we got on orbit, there was still gypsum coming out of everything! They thought they had cleaned it ... but it was just unreal what it had done!" Dust continued to be found in the spacecraft for the rest of its career.

Columbia made 130 orbits and traveled  during its 8day, 0 hour, 4minute, 46second flight. A total of 36 thermal protection tiles were lost and 19 were damaged. The orbiter was returned to Kennedy Space Center on April 6, 1982. STS-3 was the last mission for which NASA named a complete backup crew.

While on a post-mission goodwill tour in Beijing, Lousma displayed a photo he had taken from space of a "beautiful emerald-colored lake" in China and was surprised by the audience reaction. He later learned that the picture was likely of a secret atomic test site for the Chinese nuclear weapons program.

Mission insignia 
On the mission patch, Columbia is shown emerging from a star, representing the bright aspiration of space exploration. The orbiter is seen grabbing a PDP with the Canadarm, and is shown with many experiments in its payload bay. The three large orange triangular points of the mission patch indicate the flight's numerical designation in the Space Transportation System's mission sequence.

Wake-up calls 
NASA began a tradition of playing music to astronauts during the Project Gemini, and first used music to wake up a flight crew during Apollo 15. Each track is specially chosen, often by the astronauts' families, and usually has a special meaning to an individual member of the crew, or is applicable to their daily activities.

See also 

 List of human spaceflights
 List of Space Shuttle missions

References

External links 
 STS-3 mission summary. NASA.
 STS-3 video highlights . NSS.
 Video of STS-3 landing at White Sands. Spaceflight Now.

Space Shuttle missions
Spacecraft launched in 1982
March 1982 events
1982 in Florida
Spacecraft which reentered in 1982
1982 in New Mexico